The Government Model Higher Secondary School, Punnamoodu is one of the oldest schools in Thiruvananthapuram District, Kerala, India. It was established in 1915.

Schools in Thiruvananthapuram district
High schools and secondary schools in Kerala